was a Japanese politician and leader of the Japan Socialist Party. During World War II, Asanuma was aligned with the Imperial Rule Assistance Association and advocated for war in Asia. Asanuma later became a forceful advocate of socialism in post-war Japan. He was noted for his support of the newly established People's Republic of China (PRC) as well as the criticism of United States–Japanese relations, making him a polarizing figure.

Asanuma was assassinated with a wakizashi, a traditional short sword, by a far-right ultranationalist Otoya Yamaguchi while speaking in a televised political debate in Tokyo. His violent death was seen in graphic detail on national television by millions of Japanese, causing widespread public shock and outrage, although far-right groups celebrated his death and considered Yamaguchi a martyr after his suicide while in custody.

Early life and education
Asanuma was born on the island of Miyake-jima, a remote volcanic island that is administratively part of Tokyo, on 27 December 1898. His mother died during his birth, leaving him to be raised by his father, who later died of cancer, leaving Asanuma an orphan. After completing high school, Asanuma entered Waseda University, graduating in 1923. While still in college, Asanuma joined the newly formed Farmer-Labor Party and took part in various forms of leftist activism. Among other activities, he founded the "Builders League," which studied the works of English socialists, worked for Russian famine relief, and protested against military-related research being conducted at Waseda. In 1924, Asanuma left the Farmer-Labor Party after the party became divided into three different factions and became involved in tenant organizing and the Labor-Farmer movement.

Political career
In 1926, Asanuma was one of the main founders of the Japan Labour-Farmer Party, as part of his efforts to link urban labor movements with rural peasant's movements. In 1929, Asanuma began running for Tokyo City Council, representing Fukagawa ward, but was not elected until 1933. In 1936, Asanuma was elected to the National Diet of Japan for the first time as a member of the newly-formed Social Masses Party, which merged into the Imperial Rule Assistance Association in 1940. Asanuma would serve in the Diet for a total of 20 years.

As a member of the Diet, Asanuma pivoted from his earlier anti-imperialist views and became a vocal supporter of Japan's "holy war" in East Asia, claiming that it was necessary to "liberate" Asia from the forces of western imperialism. He even led the drive to censure Saitō Takao and expel him from the Social Masses Party following the latter's anti-war speech on the floor of the Diet in 1940. However, Asanuma himself decided not to run for reelection in 1942, following his failure to secure a "recommendation" from the Imperial Rule Assistance Association. In the immediate aftermath of Japan's defeat in World War II, Asanuma was one of the founders of the Japan Socialist Party (JSP), and would eventually rise to become its secretary-general (1955-1960) and eventually, party chairman (1960). As a politician, Asanuma cultivated an "everyman" image. He lived modestly in public housing his entire life, and was particularly popular among ordinary laborers, small shopkeepers, and other members of the working class.

In contrast to his pro-war stance during World War II, in the postwar period, Asanuma spearheaded the JSP's staunch opposition to revising Article 9 of Japan's postwar constitution and remilitarizing Japan. However, historian Andrew Gordon argues that Asanuma was consistent in his antipathy to western imperialism and a desire for Asia to chart its own course in world affairs.

In 1959, Asanuma was widely criticized for an incident in which he visited the People's Republic of China and called American imperialism "the shared enemy of China and Japan" during a speech in front of the Chinese Communist Party in Beijing. When he returned from this trip he wore a Mao suit while disembarking from a plane in Japan, sparking criticism even from Socialist leaders. At this time, Japan, its ally the United States, and many other countries recognized the Republic of China as the legitimate government of China. Under Asanuma's leadership, the JSP played a leading role in the massive Anpo protests against revision of the U.S.-Japan Security Treaty in 1960, which also led to the resignation of prime minister Nobusuke Kishi, angering rightists and ultranationalists who supported the treaty.

Assassination

On 12 October 1960, Asanuma was assassinated by 17-year-old Otoya Yamaguchi, a right-wing ultranationalist, during a televised political debate ahead of upcoming elections for the House of Representatives. While Asanuma spoke from the lectern at Tokyo's Hibiya Hall, Yamaguchi rushed onstage and ran his wakizashi (a traditional samurai short sword) through Asanuma's ribs on the left side, fatally wounding him. Japanese television company NHK was videorecording the debate for later transmission and the tape of Asanuma's assassination was shown many times to millions of viewers. The photograph of Asanuma's assassination won its photographer Yasushi Nagao both the Pulitzer Prize and World Press Photo of the Year.

Yamaguchi was captured at the scene of the crime, and a few weeks afterwards committed suicide by hanging while in police custody.

Commemoration

Asanuma was modest and hardworking and had earned respect from fellow lawmakers across the political spectrum. His assassination truly shocked Japan's political establishment. Shortly after his death, conservative prime minister erstwhile electoral rival Hayato Ikeda captured the mood of his fellow lawmakers when he gave a heartfelt eulogy for Asanuma on the floor of the Diet. Commemorating Asanuma as a "speech-giving everyman" (enzetsu hyakushō), Ikeda declared:

According to reportage at the time, Ikeda's short speech was met with thunderous applause and left many lawmakers in tears.

Legacy

The Japan Socialist Party had been an unhappy marriage between far left socialists, centrist socialists, and right socialists, who had been forced together in order to oppose the consolidation of conservative parties into the Liberal Democratic Party in 1955. Asanuma was a charismatic figure who had been able to hold many of these mutually antagonistic factions together through the force of his personality. Under Asanuma's leadership, the party had won an increasing amount of seats in the Diet in every election over the latter half of the 1950s and seemed to be gathering momentum.

Asanuma's untimely death deprived the party of his adroit leadership, and thrust Saburō Eda into the leadership role instead. A centrist, Eda rapidly took the party in a more centrist direction, far faster than the left socialists were ready to accept. This led to growing infighting within the party, and drastically damaged its ability to present a cohesive message to the public. Over the rest of the 1960s and going forward, the number of seats the Socialists held in the Diet continued to decline until the party's extinction in 1996.

References

Works cited

External links 

 
 

|-

|-

1898 births
1960 deaths
1960 murders in Japan
Assassinated Japanese politicians
Japanese socialists
Members of the House of Representatives from Tokyo
Members of the Tokyo Metropolitan Assembly
Waseda University alumni
Filmed assassinations
Filmed killings in Asia
Male murder victims
People murdered in Japan
Deaths by stabbing in Japan
Members of the House of Representatives (Empire of Japan)
Social Democratic Party (Japan) politicians
People from the Izu Islands
People of Shōwa-period Japan
People notable for being the subject of a specific photograph
Rightist Socialist Party of Japan politicians
October 1960 events in Asia